The IT and Development Centre, Ministry of the Interior (SMIT) is an Estonian government agency under the Ministry of the Interior responsible for providing the developing ICT services mainly to Police and Border Guard Board, Estonian Rescue Board, Estonian Emergency Response Centre, Estonian Academy of Security Sciences and the Ministry of the Interior.

Services
SMIT manages more than 100 ICT services. Following keywords will characterize the services managed by SMIT: 
 National population register and ICT services related to management of identities;
 ICT services related to application of documents (passports, ID cards, residence cards, visas);
 ICT services related to emergency and rescue services;
 ICT services related to law enforcement and criminal investigations;
 ICT services related to border check and border surveillance;
 operative radio communications networks;

Structure
 Department of services.
 Department of technologies.
 Department of development.
 Security unit.
 Finance and legal unit.
 Staff department.

See also
Police and Border Guard Board
Estonian Rescue Board
Estonian Internal Security Service
Estonian Academy of Security Sciences

External links

Government agencies of Estonia
2010 establishments in Estonia